The Toyota Owners 400 is a 400 lap NASCAR Cup Series stock car race held at the Richmond Raceway in Richmond, Virginia. From 2007 to 2011, former race title sponsor Crown Royal named the race after the winner of an essay contest during Daytona Speedweeks. The winner of the first essay contest was Jim Stewart from Houma, Louisiana, with subsequent contests won by Dan Lowry of Columbiana, Ohio, and Russ Friedman of Huntington, New York, with the 2010 race being named for Army veteran Heath Calhoun of Clarksville, Tennessee. Since 2010 only military service members have been eligible to win the contest. Crown Royal moved the "Your Name Here" sponsorship to the Brickyard 400 beginning in 2012.

For several years, the race was held as a Sunday afternoon event the weekend after the Daytona 500 in February. Lights were installed at the facility in 1991, but the spring race remained during the day. Consistent cold weather, and even a snow delay in 1989, prompted track officials to move the race later in the spring. The race was moved around to May or June and permanently moved from Sunday afternoons to Saturday nights. After a few years, the race eventually fixed as a May race date by 1999. Starting in 2012, the race was held on the last Saturday in April, after the race switched dates with the spring Talladega race. The race returned to Sunday afternoon in 2016 but returned to Saturday night in 2018. The 2020 race was not held due to the COVID-19 pandemic, being replaced with a race at Darlington Raceway.

Denny Hamlin is the defending winner of the race.

Past winners

Notes
1962: Race shortened due to darkness.
1974: Race shortened due to the energy crisis.
1977, 1982, and 2003: Race shortened due to rain.
1986: This race is largely remembered for its controversy. Dale Earnhardt spun out Darrell Waltrip at the end, and both cars crashed. Petty slipped by to win.
1988: Last race on the old layout.
1989: Race rescheduled one month later due to snow.
1998: Race moved to a Saturday night event.
2002: Race started on Saturday night but was finished on Sunday afternoon due to rain.
2007 and 2015: Race postponed from Saturday night to Sunday afternoon due to rain.
2008, 2013, and 2018: Race extended due to a NASCAR Overtime finish.
 2008 – 410 laps
 2013 – 406 laps
 2018 – 402 laps
2009: Kyle Busch won on his 24th birthday.
2020: Race moved to Darlington due to the COVID-19 pandemic

Track length notes
1953–1969: 0.5 mile course
1970–1988: 0.542 mile course
1989–present: 0.75 mile course

Multiple winners (drivers)

Multiple winners (teams)

Manufacturers wins

Crown Royal Sweepstakes winners

References

External links
 

1953 establishments in Virginia
 
NASCAR Cup Series races
Recurring sporting events established in 1953
Owners 400
Annual sporting events in the United States